Egas Palanga dos Santos Cacintura (born 29 October 1997) is an Angolan professional football player who plays as a left midfielder for Russian club FC Ufa.

Club career
In 2015, he enrolled in Kuban State Technological University in Russia where he studied to become an oil industry specialist. He also participated in the university's futsal team.

In 2019, he signed with Syktyvkar-based Russian Futsal Super League team Novaya Generatsiya, continuing his education remotely.

In the summer of 2021, he switched from futsal to football. On 23 July 2021, he signed a contract with Russian Premier League club FC Ufa. He made his RPL debut for Ufa on 25 July 2021 in a game against PFC CSKA Moscow.

Career statistics

References

External links
 
 

1997 births
People from Namibe Province
Living people
Angolan footballers
Association football midfielders
FC Ufa players
Russian Premier League players
Russian First League players
Angolan expatriate footballers
Expatriate footballers in Russia
Angolan expatriate sportspeople in Russia